In mathematics, the uniform topology on a space may mean:

 In functional analysis, it sometimes refers to a polar topology on a topological vector space.
 In general topology, it is the topology carried by a uniform space.
 In real analysis, it is the topology of uniform convergence.